Azerbaijan participated at the 2017 Summer Universiade, in Taipei, Taiwan with 19 competitors in 4 sports.

Competitors
The following table lists Azerbaijan delegation per sport and gender.

Medal summary

Athletics

Judo

Taekwondo

Weightlifting

References

Nations at the 2017 Summer Universiade
2017 in Azerbaijani sport
2017